German submarine U-866 was a Type IXC/40 U-boat of Nazi Germany's Kriegsmarine built for service during the Second World War. She was ordered on 25 August 1941, laid down in Bremen, Germany on 23 January 1943 and launched on 29 July 1943. She had one patrol.

Design
German Type IXC/40 submarines were slightly larger than the original Type IXCs. U-866 had a displacement of  when at the surface and  while submerged. She had two shafts and two  propellers.

U-866 was fitted with six  torpedo tubes (four fitted at the bow and two at the stern), 22 torpedoes, one  SK C/32 naval gun, 180 rounds, and a  Flak M42 as well as two twin  C/30 anti-aircraft guns. The boat had a complement of forty-eight.

Service history
Her commander from 17 November 1943 until December 1944 was Korvettenkapitän Walter Pommerehne, followed by Oberleutnant zur See Peter Rogowsky, who commanded her from December 1944 until 18 March 1945.

While under command of Rogowsky, on 18 March,  acquired U-866 on sonar and commenced a hedgehog attack. This attack missed the U-boat, which then settled on the ocean floor, attempting to hide from the attacking surface ships.

She did not sink or damage any ships while on patrol.

References

Bibliography

External links

German Type IX submarines
U-boats commissioned in 1943
1943 ships
World War II submarines of Germany
Ships built in Bremen (state)
U-boats sunk in 1945
World War II shipwrecks in the Atlantic Ocean
U-boats sunk by depth charges
U-boats sunk by US warships
Ships lost with all hands
Maritime incidents in March 1945